Nikolai Pavlovich Gontar (born 29 April 1949) is a Russian football coach and a former player.

Honours
 Soviet Top League winner: 1976 (spring)
 Soviet Top League bronze: 1975
 Top 33 players year-end list: 1976

International career
Gontar made his debut for the USSR on 28 November 1976 in a friendly against Argentina. He played in the UEFA Euro 1980 qualifiers (the USSR did not qualify for the final tournament).

External links
 Profile 

1949 births
Living people
Soviet footballers
Soviet Union international footballers
Soviet Top League players
FC Luch Vladivostok players
FC Dynamo Moscow players
Russian footballers
Association football goalkeepers
Sportspeople from Vladivostok